Sirom-e Sofla (also Romanized as Sīrom-e Soflá) is a village in Tang-e Haft Rural District, Papi District, Khorramabad County, Lorestan Province, Iran. At the 2006 census, its population was 85, in 22 families.

References 

Towns and villages in Khorramabad County